Kasper Andersen may refer to:
 Kasper Andersen (cyclist) (born 2002), Danish cyclist
 Kasper Andersen (speedway rider) (born 1998), Danish speedway rider
 Kasper Irming Andersen (born 1986), Danish handball player